Rustam Dushmanziyar was a Daylamite aristocrat and the ancestor of the Kakuyid dynasty. His personal name was Rustam, but was known as Dushmanziyar, which is the Daylami version of the Persian word Dushmanzar ("he who brings grief to his enemy").

Biography 
Rustam was the brother of the wife of the Buyid ruler Fakhr al-Dawla, Sayyida Shirin, who was sister, or more likely, the niece of the Bavandid ruler al-Marzuban. Rustam had a son named Muhammad ibn Rustam Dushmanziyar, who would later establish the Kakuyid dynasty of Isfahan.

Rustam, because of his great service to Fakhr al-Dawla, was rewarded with land in Alborz in appreciation of his services. His duty was to protect Ray and northern Jibal against the local leaders from Tabaristan. He later died at an unknown date before 1007, which was the date Muhammad ibn Rustam Dushmanziyar established the Kakuyid dynasty.

References

Sources 

 
 
 
 
 

Daylamites
1000s deaths
Date of birth unknown
Kakuyids
10th-century Iranian people
Buyid generals
Buyid governors
Bavand dynasty